This is a list of the highest elevation in each county in New York, in order from 1 to 62.

References

Mountains of New York (state)